Gilbert Horseley was an Elizabethan privateer who lead raids in Veragua and colonial Honduras.

Career

Departure
Sylvester, a French corsair, is thought to have cleared from Havre in September 1574, aboard a ship 'carrying a hundred fighting men.' They set upon Veragua that December, where it is thought that African slaves informed them of Spanish merchant-ships off the northern coast of the province. Consequently, in the first quarter of 1575, 'the said corsairs [...] divided their forces [...] endeavouring to join with the cimarrones [and so went] to the Desaguadero (San Juan River) [...] to take the frigates come from there [...].'

Horseley is thought to have cleared from Plymouth in November 1574, with a crew of 25, aboard the John, a 25-tonne pinnace, and to have come upon Sylvester just before that captain's northward journey to Desaguadero.

Expedition

Southern leg 
Upon arriving at Veragua, the English crew (like the French) 'got into touch with the "Sem Rownes."' Now in consort, and with a Portuguese pilot (Luis Marquês), Horseley and Sylvester ascended the San Juan River, intending to sack Granada. Before reaching said city, however, the crew came upon certain Spanish frigates, in which vecinos from Olancho were transporting African slaves to Veragua. This treasure having satisfied both parties, Horseley and Sylvester desisted from their enterprise and returned to open sea.

Their treasure secured in the Desaguadero, Horseley and Sylvester sailed back to Veragua, where 'acts of exceptional and cowardly cruelty were committed.' The crews are thought to have killed 'many people, cutting their throats,' and to further have 'committed great robberies and insults.' Thereafter, the parties parted ways, with Horseley sailing back to the Bay of Honduras.

Northern leg 

Horseley entered the Bay of Honduras on 2 April 1575, making landfall at Cape Honduras (near Puerto Castilla under cover of night. At the break of midnight, the crew, packed into a launch, surreptitiously stole towards Trujillo (three leguas distant), but were immediately sighted by a keen-eyed sentinel at the Fortress of Santa Barbara. The city's military and vecinos rushed to organise a defence, which proved formidable enough to convince Horseley to desist. The crew were fired upon by the Fort, to ensure their retreat, but this did was not sufficient to stop Horseley from seizing a Spanish frigate at port.

At the break of day, on 3 April 1575, Fort sentinels spotted Horseley (now in their frigate) making for Puerto Caballos, likely 'to pillage the port and the ships which were there.' A warning shallop was forthwith despatched from the Fort, but being spotted by the English, was seized some 20 leagues into its trip (off present-day Atlantida). That afternoon, Horseley seized another Spanish prize (Juan Antonio owner), laden with treasure worth over 3,000 ducats. These latter are thought to have been cruelly treated, being tortured by Horseley's crew for gold and sailing directions.

This accomplished, Hershey continued towards Puerto Caballos (aboard his ship and the launch). Upon reaching El Triunfo de la Cruz, they met two Spanish merchant-ships (Martín Monte and Vicencio Garullo captains). These the English attempted to board, but were heavily bombarded with artillery, the merchants forcing the former to desist.

Horseley now made for Cape Camaron (20 leagues due east of Trujillo), reaching it the night of 5 April 1575. The crew watered at this cape, during which time two of their Spanish prisoners made their escape. They reported that Horseley had warned he 'would return another year with a greater force.'

Return
Horseley 'now passably rich [...] arrived at Plymouth with fifteen of this men in June 1575,' from where he immediately continued to Arundel to unload his treasure 'without causing unwelcome interest.'

Aftermath
Diego López reported the degradation to the Spanish Crown, writing

The Crown thanked López for his service, and gave instructions to the presiding officer of the Real Audiencia of Guatemala 'concerning money,' and to authorities at Seville 'concerning artillery' for Trujillo's defence.

Legacy 
Horseley and Sylvester's ascent of the San Juan River has been described as 'daring' and 'comparable to Drake's most daring exploits,' given that said river, 'unlike the sea, kept no safe retreat upen for [the captains],' and that the expedition was completed with a small crew and pinnace.

Notes

Citations

References 

 
 
 
 
 
 
 
 
 
 
 
 
 
 
 
 
 
 
 

English privateers
16th-century English people